Arafura refers to the name of the Arafura Sea, and by extension to adjoining areas or associated events:

Animals
 Arafura catfish, Netuma proxima
 Arafura fantail, Rhipidura dryas
 Arafura file snake, Acrochordus arafurae
 Arafura large-footed bat, Myotis moluccarum
 Arafura shrikethrush, Colluricincla megarhyncha

Places
 Arafura Jungles, north-east Arnhem Land, Northern Territory, Australia
 Arafura Sea, located between northern Australia and New Guinea
 Arafura Swamp, north-east Arnhem Land, Northern Territory, Australia
 Electoral division of Arafura, in Australia's Northern Territory

Other
 Arafura-class offshore patrol vessel
 Arafura Games, international multi-sport event drawing competitors from Australasia and Asia
 Arafura Resources, Australian mineral exploration company